, better known by his ring names Nosawa and , (born December 17, 1976) is a Japanese retired professional wrestler, best known for his appearances in All Japan Pro Wrestling and various independent promotions.

Career

Early career (19952004)
Nosawa spent most of his early career training and wrestling in Mexico, most notably with Consejo Mundial de Lucha Libre (CMLL). He also spent much of his early career competing on the U.S. independent scene, Nosawa has competed for American promotions such as Ring of Honor (ROH), Pro Wrestling Guerrilla (PWG), and Xtreme Pro Wrestling (XPW). Along with Mitsunobu Kikuzawa, Kazuhiko Masada, Minoru Fujita and Katsushi Takemura, Nosawa created the group "Tokyo Gurentai".

In 2004, he would adapt the "Nosawa Rongai" or "Nosawa Out of the Question" ring name as a play off to a comment made by Kaz Hayashi, who had replied "Nosawa is out of the question" when he was asked about whether he was going to allow Kazushige to challenge for the World Junior Heavyweight Championship. By doing this, Nosawa forced a title match against Hayashi, and although he lost, he would decide to keep the name for the rest of his career.

Juggalo Championship Wrestling

JCW Heavyweight Champion (20032007)
On March 16, 2003, at a Juggalo Championship Wrestling (JCW) event, Nosawa defeated "Ritchie Boy" Breyer Wellington to win the JCW Heavyweight Championship. Later that year, he was featured on JCW Vol. 3 in a match where he again defeated Wellington. In July 2004, Nosawa lost the championship to Kid Kash at the Gathering of the Juggalos. In 2007, he took part in the Pro Wrestling Unplugged/Juggalo Championship Wrestling cross promotional event "Cuffed & Caged: Last Man Standing". Nosawa was featured in the main event War Games match as a member of Team JCW.

SlamTV! (2007)
In 2007, Nosawa went on tour with JCW to film the Internet wrestling show SlamTV!, where he was one of the main heroes of the program. However, he started off his SlamTV! tour with a string of losses, going 0–5 in his first five matches. After receiving a letter from his storyline mentor The Great Muta, saying that Muta was coming to JCW to check up on his pupil, Nosawa stepped up his game and began a winning streak. At "East Side Wars", The Great Muta teamed with Nosawa to help him defeat the team of Mad Man Pondo and Necro Butcher. By the following week however, The Great Muta had left. Despite this, Nosawa continued his winning streak into episode 14, where he faced and defeated Ron Zombie. During the match, Justin Credible came to the ring and assaulted Nosawa. On the next episode, Nosawa interfered in Credible's match by spitting Asian mist into his eyes. At Bloodymania, Nosawa and The Great Muta teamed up again to defeat Justin Credible and 2 Cold Scorpio.

Juggalo World Order (20072008)

On October 6, 2007, Corporal Robinson, Scott Hall, and Violent J formed the Juggalo World Order (JWO) at Evansville Invasion. At that year's Hallowicked After Party, on October 31, Shaggy 2 Dope was introduced as a member of the group. After the main event of the night, special guest referee Nosawa ripped off his referee shirt to reveal that he, too, was a member of the JWO. Nosawa appeared in a few matches with the JWO, before returning to Japan.

Total Nonstop Action Wrestling (20032004)
Nosawa would first gain national U.S. exposure by making appearances for Total Nonstop Action Wrestling (TNA). He debuted at the 2003 Super X Cup, losing in the first round to Juventud Guerrera; he then reappeared as captain of Team Japan in the 2004 World X Cup, where he ended up placing last by the end of the tournament. Nosawa would go on to make sporadic appearances on the early episodes of TNA Impact, usually teaming up with fellow Japanese rookie Kazushi Miyamoto. The duo even challenged for the NWA World Tag Team Championship at TNA's second Anniversary show in June 2004, but ultimately came up short against America's Most Wanted. The duo's last in-ring appearance for the company would be at Victory Road '04, where both Nosawa and Miyamoto competed in the X-Division Gauntlet match, which was won by Hector Garza.

All Japan Pro Wrestling (20052008)
Nosawa would originally find little success after arriving in All Japan Pro Wrestling (AJPW) in the mid-2000s, losing as many matches as he won. On March 20, 2005, he received an opportunity at the World Junior Heavyweight Championship, but would lose to defending champion Taka Michinoku. On July 26, he lost a "Banishment" match to his old friend Mazada, and was forced to leave All Japan. Soon after that, he would reappear as a masked wrestler named Space Lone Wolf (Keiji Mutoh's old alter-ego), finding more success than his previous character. However, by December, Space Lone Wolf would be unmasked and revealed as being Nosawa.

In 2006, Nosawa would begin again wrestling with his old friend Mazada again, and for parts of the year would also team with Brute Issei and Akira. Towards the end of 2006, Nosawa and Mazada began to team up with Minoru Suzuki to form "Minoru Gundan", which landed Nosawa a more prominent role in the promotion. He and Suzuki would go on to wrestle in the World's Strongest Tag Determination League, but unfortunately the team would come in last place.

In 2007, Nosawa promoted several comedy wrestling shows, making fun of Antonio Inoki's Inoki Genome Federation and using both talent from All Japan, as well as freelancers. During the Champion Carnival, Nosawa switched his name to El Nosawa Mendoza and formed a new stable called "Los Mexico Amigos", with Pepe Michinoku (Taka Michinoku) and Miguel Hayashi, Jr (Kaz Hayashi). Nobutaka Araya then joined the team as El Hijo del Araya Segundo after the Carnival's final show. Along with changing their names, the group wore the official colors of the Mexican Flag (Red/Green/White). After multiple bouts against Minoru Suzuki, Nosawa offered Suzuki an invitation into Mexico Amigos, to which he declined. This resulted in the group changing multiple assets. Their name was changed to Mexico Amigos Black, the previous worn Mexican Flag attire became black and gold attire, and Araya was kicked out of the group. Later in the year, Mexico Amigos teamed with "Ray Suzuki" to defeat the team of Ryuji Hijikata, Kikutaro, T28 and Ryuji Yamaguchi. After the match, Ray Suzuki revealed himself as Minoru Suzuki. Suzuki stated that starting the next year Mendoza would throw his Amigos tights away and return to the Nosawa Rongai ring name, Suzuki then kidnapped Nosawa to start his "early training". This was followed by Pepe and Miguel announcing they would return to Mexico, while Kaz Hayashi and Taka Michinoku were announced as returning to All Japan come the new year. After one last "Viva Mexico", Los Mexico Amigos disbanded.

Tokyo Gurentai and other promotions (2007present)

Since disbanding from Mexico Amigos, Nosawa has rejoined teaming with Mazada and Takemura as the "Tokyo Gurentai". Nosawa, Mazada, and Takemura later align themselves with Minoru Suzuki and Taiyō Kea, and dubbed their new group GURENTAI. Nosawa won a game of Jenga for the group's leadership role, but Suzuki immediately shot down the idea of Nosawa as the leader. Nosawa would later return to All Japan Pro Wrestling (AJPW) and was defeated by Rene Dupree in his return match.

Outside of AJPW, Nosawa performed for companies under the Global Professional Wrestling Alliance (GPWA) banner up until the alliance's demise, sometimes alongside his mentor Keiji Mutoh.

On February 20, 2011, Nosawa was arrested on charges of stealing a taxi and driving it without having a driving license. Two days later Nosawa announced that he was taking an indefinite break from professional wrestling. Nosawa returned from his break on June 25 at a Minoru Suzuki promoted charity event, losing to Suzuki in the main event.

Since September 2013, Tokyo Gurentai, Nosawa included, has worked regularly for Wrestle-1.

Since April 2015, Nosawa joined the newly resurrected Frontier Martial-Arts Wrestling, as the leader of Monster-gun, which evolved into W*ING Monster-gun, when Kintaro Kanemura joined the group.

On August 27, 2017, Nosawa, as Black Tiger VII, teamed with Taka Michinoku to defeat Atsushi Aoki and Hikaru Sato for the AJPW All Asia Tag Team Championship. They lost the title to Naoya Nomura and Yuma Aoyagi on September 30.

Nosawa is currently working as the head booker for Pro Wrestling Noah.

Los Perros del Mal de Japón

In December 2020, Kotaro Suzuki aligned himself with Rongai and his mystery partner, who later revealed to be Ikuto Hidaka. Over the following months, the trio continued their rivalry with Stinger, while also being joined by Yo-Hey in May 2021 following the disbandment of Full Trottle. The following month, Dragon Gate wrestler Eita, who had previously worked in Mexican wrestling promotions and met Rongai in 2017, was revealed to be the newest member of the group.

On June 27, at Muta The World, the stable's name was revealed to be dubbed Los Perros del Mal de Japón, as a tribute to the Mexican stable Los Perros del Mal after Eita, Rongai and Yo-Hey won against Stinger (Yoshinari Ogawa, Seiki Yoshioka and Yuya Susumu). A brawl began between the two stables with Suzuki and Ikuto Hidaka coming to help them, outnumbering and overwhelming Stinger. Rongai later revealed that relatives of Perro Aguayo Jr., the founders of the Los Perros del Mal, had granted him permission to use the stable's name.

At Grand Square 2021 In Osaka, Eita and Rongai defeated Atsushi Kotoge and Hajime Ohara to win the GHC Junior Heavyweight Tag Team Championship.

Personal life

Marijuana arrest
On May 23, 2012, Nosawa and former girlfriend Io Shirai were arrested at the Narita International Airport in Narita, Chiba upon their return from Mexico to Japan under suspicion of trying to smuggle 75 grams of marijuana, hidden inside paintings of the two, into the country. On July 9, Mexico-based Japanese wrestler Takuya Sugi held a press conference and confessed to planting the drugs on Shirai and Nosawa. According to Sugi, Masahiro Hayashi, who worked as a liaison between AAA and Japan and who had a personal grudge with Nosawa, had promised him a contract extension with AAA in exchange for the deed.

Championships and accomplishments
All Japan Pro Wrestling
All Asia Tag Team Championship (3 times, current) – with Minoru Suzuki (1), Taka Michinoku (1) and Kendo Kashin (1, current)
AJPW Junior Tag League (2006) – with Mazada
Apache Army
WEW World Tag Team Championship (1 time) – with Mazada
Chō Sentō Puroresu FMW
FMW World Street Fight 8-Man Tag Team Championship (1 time) – with Black Tiger V, Great Tiger and Tiger Mask III Tigre en Mascarado
Consejo Mundial de Lucha Libre
CMLL Japan Tag Team Championship (1 time) – with Sasuke the Great
CMLL World Welterweight Championship (2 times)
Dragon Gate
Open the Triangle Gate Championship (2 times) – with Kotaro Suzuki and Eita
Dramatic Dream Team/DDT Pro-Wrestling
DDT Extreme Championship (1 time)
KO-D Openweight Championship (1 time)
KO-D Tag Team Championship (1 time) – with Takashi Sasaki
UWA World Trios Championship (2 times) – with Fujita and Mazada
El Dorado Wrestling
UWA World Tag Team Championship (1 time) – with Mazada
International Wrestling Revolution Group
IWRG Intercontinental Tag Team Championship (1 time) – with Masada
IWRG Intercontinental Trios Championship (1 time) – with Masada and Takemura
Copa Higher Power (2004) – with Masada, Garuda and Black Tiger III
Juggalo Championship Wrestling
JCW Heavyweight Championship (1 time)
Mobius
Apex of Triangle Six–Man Tag Team Championship (2 times) - with Mazada and Takemura (1) and Daisuke Sekimoto and Tetsuhiro Kuroda (1)
New Japan Pro-Wrestling
Road to the Super Jr.2Days Tournament (2012)
Pro Wrestling Noah
GHC Junior Heavyweight Tag Team Championship (1 time) – with Eita
Tokyo Gurentai
Tokyo World Heavyweight Championship (1 time)
Tokyo World Tag Team Championship (1 time) – with Mazada
Wrestle-1
UWA World Trios Championship (3 times) – with Kazma Sakamoto and Koji Doi (1), Jun Kasai and Shuji Kondo (1), and Ganseki Tanaka and Manabu Soya (1)
Xtreme Latin American Wrestling
X-LAW International Championship (1 time)
Other titles
Americas World Mixed Tag Team Championship (1 time) – with Io Shirai
Arena Azteca Budokan Light Heavyweight Championship (1 time)
Guerrero State Welterweight Championship (1 time)

Luchas de Apuestas record

Notes

References

External links
Profile on All Japan's Official Site
Profile on bodyslamming.com
 NOSAWA's Old Blog
 NOSAWA's Current Official Blog
 Tokyo Gurentai Official Site

1976 births
Japanese male professional wrestlers
Living people
People from Ichikawa, Chiba
Suzuki-gun members
GHC Junior Heavyweight Tag Team Champions
All Asia Tag Team Champions
CMLL World Welterweight Champions
20th-century professional wrestlers
21st-century professional wrestlers
UWA World Trios Champions
UWA World Tag Team Champions
DDT Extreme Champions
KO-D Tag Team Champions
KO-D Openweight Champions
Open the Triangle Gate Champions
WEW World Tag Team Champions